Route 230, or Highway 230, may refer to:

Argentina
 Route 230

Canada
 Manitoba Provincial Road 230
 Newfoundland and Labrador Route 230
 Prince Edward Island Route 230

Costa Rica
 National Route 230

India
 National Highway 230 (India)

Japan
 Japan National Route 230

United States
 U.S. Route 230 (former)
 California State Route 230
 Florida State Road 230
 Georgia State Route 230
Kentucky Route 230
 Maine State Route 230
 Montana Secondary Highway 230 (former)
 Nevada State Route 230
 New Mexico State Road 230
 New York State Route 230
 Ohio State Route 230 (former)
 Oregon Route 230
 Pennsylvania Route 230
 South Carolina Highway 230
 South Dakota Highway 230
 Tennessee State Route 230
 Texas State Highway 230
 Texas State Highway Loop 230
 Farm to Market Road 230 in Texas
 Utah State Route 230 (former)
 Virginia State Route 230
 Washington State Route 230
 West Virginia Route 230
 Wyoming Highway 230